St Joseph's College (Dutch, Sint-Jozefscollege) is a Roman Catholic subsidized free school for general secondary education founded by the Society of Jesus in Aalst. The school building is a protected monument.

Teachers 

 Joseph-Olivier Andries (1796-1886)
 Evarist Bauwens s.j. (1853-1937)

 Emiel Fleerackers s.j. (1877-1948)
 Adhemar Geerebaert s.j. (1876-1944)
 Marcel Schurmans s.j. (1909-1989)
 Desideer Stracke s.j. (1875-1970)
 Lode Taeymans s.j. (1874-1937)
 Constant Van Crombrugghe (1789-1885)
 André Van Iseghem s.j. (1799-1869)
 Jozef Van Opdenbosch s.j. (1892-1944)
 Antonius van Torre s.j. (1615-1679)

History
In 1622, the Jesuits founded a school dedicated to Saint Joseph at the Pontstraat in Aalst. A century later, a church hall with a baroque facade was added. St Joseph College was continually expanded over the centuries and rebuilt. In 1997, the school complex was made a protected monument.

Former students
Notable students of the school include:
 Adolf Daens
 Jean-Luc Dehaene
 Piet Vanthemsche
 Herman Le Compte
 Maurice De Bevere

Gallery

See also
 List of Jesuit sites in Belgium
 Diocese of Ghent

References

External links
St Joseph's College site

Aalst, Belgium
Buildings and structures in East Flanders
Jesuit secondary schools in Belgium
Educational institutions established in the 1620s